"My Wave" is a song by the American rock band Soundgarden. Featuring lyrics written by frontman Chris Cornell and music co-written by Cornell and guitarist Kim Thayil, "My Wave" was released in 1994 as the fourth single from the band's fourth studio album, Superunknown (1994). The song peaked at number 11 on the Billboard Mainstream Rock Tracks chart.

Composition
"My Wave" features lyrics written by frontman Chris Cornell and music co-written by Cornell and guitarist Kim Thayil. The tuning, as with many Soundgarden songs, is unorthodox—E-E-B-B-B-B. The song is in the keys of E minor and B mixolydian. The song also features the use of a bass wah pedal by Ben Shepherd. "My Wave" as a musical piece is very typical of Soundgarden's style. The effect created is both authoritatively erratic and characteristic of the band, even classically so. Guitarist Kim Thayil has said that Soundgarden usually did not consider the time signature of a song until after the band had written it, and said that the use of odd meters was "a total accident."

Release and reception
"My Wave" peaked at number 11 on the Billboard Mainstream Rock Tracks chart and number 18 on the Billboard Modern Rock Tracks chart. Outside the United States, the single was released commercially in Australia. In Canada, the song reached the top 70 on the Canadian Singles Chart.

Jon Pareles of The New York Times said, "Amid its warring left- and right-channel guitars, "My Wave" includes a drum break harking back to Abbey Road." In The Village Voice, Robert Christgau said while Soundgarden had emulated Led Zeppelin in their music, "Zep never reached out like Cornell in 'My Wave'", citing the lyric, "Cry, if you want to cry/If it helps you see/If it clears your eyes/Hate, if you want to hate/If it keeps you safe/If it makes you brave."

"My Wave" appeared in the trailer for the 1994 film, The Endless Summer II. The song is featured on the soundtrack for the 2004 film, Riding Giants. It later appeared in a 2007 advertisement for the sixth season of the popular television series, 24.

Music video
The music video for "My Wave" was co-directed by Henry Shepherd (bassist Ben Shepherd's brother), who would later direct the international version of the music video for "Pretty Noose", and Doug Pray. The video largely consists of performance footage of the band filmed in Calgary, Alberta on August 11, 1994, at Max Bell Arena. It also features scenes of a child riding his bicycle around a city. The blue guy is a friend of the band called Matt “the Tube” Crowley from the Jim Rose Circus Sideshow. The video was released in October 1994. MTV decided not to put the video into its rotation. It is available on the CD-ROM Alive in the Superunknown.

Live performances
Live performances of "My Wave" can be found on the "Black Hole Sun", "My Wave", and "Fell on Black Days" singles.

Track listing
All songs written by Chris Cornell and Kim Thayil, except where noted:

Promotional CD (US)
"My Wave" – 5:12

CD (Australia)
"My Wave" – 5:12
"Spoonman" (Steve Fisk remix) (Cornell) – 6:55
"Birth Ritual" (demo) (Cornell, Matt Cameron, Thayil) – 5:50
"My Wave" (live) – 4:34
Recorded live on August 20, 1993 at Jones Beach Amphitheater in Wantagh, New York.

Charts

References

External links

1994 singles
Soundgarden songs
Song recordings produced by Chris Cornell
Song recordings produced by Matt Cameron
Songs written by Chris Cornell
Song recordings produced by Michael Beinhorn
Songs written by Kim Thayil
1994 songs